Thomas John Brokaw (born February 6, 1940) is an American retired network television journalist and author. He first served as the co-anchor of The Today Show from 1976 to 1981 with Jane Pauley, then as the anchor and managing editor of NBC Nightly News for 22 years (1982–2004). At this position he was one of the "Big Three anchors" along with Dan Rather and Peter Jennings. In the previous decade he served as a weekend anchor for the program from 1973 to 1976. He is the only person to have hosted all three major NBC News programs: The Today Show, NBC Nightly News, and, briefly, Meet the Press. He formerly held a special correspondent post for NBC News.

Along with his competitors Peter Jennings at ABC News and Dan Rather at CBS News, Brokaw was one of the "Big Three" U.S. news anchors during the 1980s, 1990s and early 2000s. All three hosted their networks' flagship nightly news programs for more than 20 years. Brokaw has also written several books on American history and society in the 20th century including The Greatest Generation (1998). He occasionally writes and narrates documentaries for other outlets. In 2021, NBC announced that Brokaw would retire after 55 years at the network, one of the longest standing anchors in the world at the same news network.

Brokaw is recipient of numerous awards and honors including the two Peabody Awards, and two Emmy Awards, as well the Presidential Medal of Freedom, which was awarded to him by President Barack Obama in 2014. and a French Legion of Honor in 2016.

Early life 

Brokaw was born in Webster, South Dakota, the son of Eugenia "Jean" (née Conley; 1917–2011), who worked in sales and as a post-office clerk, and Anthony Orville "Red" Brokaw (1912–1982). He was the eldest of their three sons (brothers named William and Michael) and named for his maternal great-grandfather, Thomas Conley.

His father was a descendant of Huguenot immigrants Bourgon and Catherine (née Le Fèvre) Broucard, and his mother was Irish-American, although the origin of the name Brokaw is contested. His paternal great-grandfather, Richard P. Brokaw, founded the town of Bristol, South Dakota, and the Brokaw House, a small hotel and the first structure in Bristol.

Brokaw's father was a construction foreman for the Army Corps of Engineers. He worked at the Black Hills Ordnance Depot (BHOD) and helped construct Fort Randall Dam; his job often required the family to resettle throughout South Dakota during Brokaw's early childhood. The Brokaws lived for short periods in Bristol, Igloo (the small residential community of the BHOD), and Pickstown, before settling in Yankton, where Brokaw attended high school.

As a high school student attending Yankton Senior High School, Brokaw was governor of South Dakota American Legion Boys State, and in that capacity he accompanied then-South Dakota Governor Joe Foss to New York City for a joint appearance on a TV game show. It was to be the beginning of a long relationship with Foss, whom Brokaw would later feature in his book about World War II veterans, The Greatest Generation. Brokaw also became an Advisory Board member of the Joe Foss Institute.

Brokaw matriculated at the University of Iowa in Iowa City, Iowa, but dropped out after a year as he apparently failed to keep up in his studies, in his words majoring in "beer and co-eds".  In 2010, he was awarded an honorary doctorate from the University, and he later donated his papers to the University of Iowa Libraries. He joked that the "honorary degree is especially coveted because it helps to make up for the uneven (to put it mildly) performance of my freshman year." He later transferred to the University of South Dakota, where he graduated Phi Beta Kappa in 1964 with a Bachelor of Arts degree in political science.

For several years, Brokaw mountain-climbed with the "Do Boys," whose members included Yvon Chouinard and Douglas Tompkins. He owned 53-acres with a home in Pound Ridge, New York, for over two decades.

Broadcasting career

1966–1981: Early years 

Brokaw's television career began at KTIV in Sioux City, Iowa followed by stints at KMTV in Omaha, Nebraska, and WSB-TV in Atlanta, In 1966, he joined NBC News, reporting from Los Angeles and anchoring the 11:00 pm news for KNBC. In 1973, NBC made Brokaw White House correspondent, covering the Watergate scandal, and anchor of the Saturday editions of Nightly News.  He became co-host (with Jane Pauley) of NBC's Today Show in 1976 and remained in the job until 1981, when he was succeeded by Bryant Gumbel.

He kept a closely guarded secret for many years, in 2017 Brokaw wrote of having been offered – and having promptly turned down – the press secretary position in the Nixon White House in 1969. While living in California before Nixon made his political comeback, Brokaw had come to know H. R. 'Bob' Haldeman (White House chief of staff and initiator of the offer) as well as Nixon's press secretary, Ron Ziegler, and others members of the White House staff.

In 2019, Brokaw wrote a book entitled, "The Fall of Richard Nixon: A Reporter Remembers Watergate", about his experiences working as a reporter and experiences as a member of the White House press corps.

1982–2004: NBC Nightly News 

On April 5, 1982, Brokaw began co-anchoring NBC Nightly News from New York with Roger Mudd in Washington, succeeding John Chancellor.  After a year, NBC News president Reuven Frank concluded that the dual-anchor program was not working and selected Brokaw to be sole anchor. The NBC Nightly News with Tom Brokaw commenced on September 5, 1983. Among other news items, he covered the Challenger disaster, EDSA Revolution, the June Struggle, Loma Prieta earthquake, fall of the Berlin Wall and Hurricane Andrew.

Brokaw scored a major coup when, on November 9, 1989, he was the first English-language broadcast journalist to report the Fall of the Berlin Wall. Brokaw attended a televised press conference organized in East Berlin by Günter Schabowski, press spokesman for East German Politburo, which had just decided to allow its citizens to apply to permanently leave the country through its border with West Germany. When Schabowski was asked when this loosening of regulations would take effect, he glanced through his notes, then said, "sofort, unverzüglich" ("immediately, without delay"), touching off a stampede of East Berliners to the Wall. Brokaw had an interview with Schabowski after the press conference, who repeated his "immediately" statement when pressed. Later that evening Brokaw reported from the west side of Brandenburg Gate on this announcement and pandemonium that had broken out in East Berlin because of it.

As anchor, Brokaw conducted the first one-on-one American television interviews with Soviet leader Mikhail Gorbachev and Russian President Vladimir Putin. He and Katie Couric hosted a prime-time newsmagazine, Now, that aired from 1993 to 1994 before being folded into the multi-night Dateline NBC program.

Also, in 1993, on the first broadcast of Late Show with David Letterman on CBS, in response to David Letterman's monologue containing jokes about NBC, Brokaw walked on stage in a surprise cameo (accompanied by Paul Shaffer and the CBS Orchestra playing the NBC Nightly News theme).  He congratulated Letterman on his new show and wished him well, but also stated he was disappointed and shocked; he subsequently walked over to the man holding the cue cards, took two, and remarked, "These last two jokes are the intellectual property of NBC!", leaving the stage afterwards.  Letterman then remarked, "Who would have thought you would ever hear the words 'intellectual property' and 'NBC' in the same sentence?"

In 1996 Brokaw made the following statement about Richard Jewell's suspected involvement in the 1996 Olympic Park bombing, after which Jewell sued NBC News:

Even though NBC stood by its story, the network agreed to pay Jewell $500,000.

On September 11, 2001, Brokaw joined Katie Couric and Matt Lauer around 9:30 a.m., following the live attack on the South Tower of the World Trade Center, and continued to anchor all day, until after midnight. Following the collapse of the second tower, Brokaw observed: "This is war.  This is a declaration and an execution of an attack on the United States." He continued to anchor coverage to midnight on the following two days. Later that month, a letter containing anthrax was addressed to him as part of the 2001 anthrax attacks. Brokaw was not harmed, but two NBC News employees were infected. In 2008, he testified before the Commission on Prevention of Weapons of Mass Destruction Proliferation and Terrorism about the anthrax attacks, publicly discussing his experiences for the first time in a detailed, day-by-day account.

In 2002, NBC announced that Brokaw would retire as anchor of the NBC Nightly News following the 2004 Presidential election, to be succeeded by Brian Williams. Brokaw would remain with NBC News in a part-time capacity from that point onwards, serving as an analyst and anchoring and producing documentary programs. Brokaw closed his final Nightly News broadcast in front of 15.7 million viewers on NBC on December 1, 2004, by saying:

By the end of his time as Nightly News anchor, Brokaw was regarded as the most popular news personality in the United States. Nightly News had moved into first place in the Nielsen ratings in late 1996 and held on to the spot for the remainder of Brokaw's tenure on the program, placing him ahead of ABC's Peter Jennings and World News Tonight, and CBS's Dan Rather and the CBS Evening News.
Along with Jennings and Rather, Brokaw helped usher in the era of the TV news anchor as a lavishly compensated, globe-trotting star in the 1980s. The magnitude of a news event could be measured by whether Brokaw and his counterparts on the other two networks showed up on the scene. Brokaw's retirement in December 2004, followed by Rather's ousting from the CBS Evening News in March 2005, and Jennings's death in August 2005, brought that era to a close.

2004–2021: After Nightly News 

After leaving the anchor chair, Brokaw remained at NBC as Special Correspondent, providing periodic reports for Nightly News.  He served as an NBC analyst during the 2008 presidential election campaign and moderated the second presidential debate between Barack Obama and John McCain at Belmont University.  He reported documentaries for the Discovery Channel and the History Channel and in 2006 delivered one of the eulogies during the state funeral of former President Gerald R. Ford.

On June 13, 2008, when NBC interrupted its regular programming to announce the sudden death of NBC News Washington Bureau Chief and Meet the Press moderator Tim Russert, Brokaw served as the announcer.  A week later, NBC announced that Brokaw would serve as host of Meet the Press on an interim basis.  He was succeeded by David Gregory in December 2008.

Brokaw serves on the board of directors of the Council on Foreign Relations, the Committee to Protect Journalists, the International Rescue Committee and the Mayo Clinic.  He is also a member of the Howard University School of Communications Board of Visitors and a trustee of the University of South Dakota, the Norton Simon Museum, the American Museum of Natural History, and the International Rescue Committee. He also provides the voiceover for a University of Iowa advertisement that airs on television during Iowa Hawkeyes athletic events.

In 2011 Brokaw began hosting The Boys in the Hall, a baseball documentary series for Fox Sports Net.

In December 2012, Brokaw starred in the Mormon Tabernacle Choir's annual Christmas concert, with live audiences of 84,000. The concert, titled Home for the Holidays, was nationally televised in December 2013.

In April 2014, a new broadcast facility opened on the Universal Studios Hollywood lot, and named in Brokaw's honor as the Brokaw News Center.  The facility houses KNBC-TV, Telemundo owned-and-operated station KVEA, and the Los Angeles bureau of NBC News.

In November 2014, President Barack Obama presented Brokaw with the Presidential Medal of Freedom, American's highest civilian honor. He received the honor with the citation, "The chronicler of the Greatest Generation...we celebrate him as one of our nation’s greatest journalists".

On March 11, 2016, Brokaw gave one of the eulogies for former First Lady Nancy Reagan at her funeral. He spoke about his relationship with both the Reagans as a reporter and later anchor.

On January 22, 2021, NBC announced Brokaw would retire after 55 years at the network, one of the few news anchors in the world who have spent the longest time on the same news network, along with Ecuadorian news anchor Alfonso Espinosa de los Monteros who has been in Ecuavisa since 1967.

Personal life 
Since 1962, Brokaw has been married to author Meredith Lynn Auld. They have three daughters: Jennifer, Andrea, and Sarah. Brokaw and his wife spend considerable time at their ranch near Livingston, Montana, which they bought in 1989.

On September 6, 2012, Brokaw was hospitalized after appearing on MSNBC's Morning Joe. He later tweeted that he was "all well" and explained his illness as having accidentally taken half a dose of Ambien in the morning. He was diagnosed with multiple myeloma, a treatable but incurable blood cancer, in August 2013 at the Mayo Clinic. Brokaw and his physicians were "very encouraged with his progress".  He continued to work for NBC throughout his treatments. On December 21, 2014, Brokaw announced that his cancer is in full remission. His book A Lucky Life Interrupted tells the personal and compelling story of his battle with multiple myeloma.

In 2018, Brokaw was accused of unwanted sexual advances toward two women in the 1990s. Brokaw denied the allegations. In response to the allegations, former colleagues Rachel Maddow, Andrea Mitchell, Maria Shriver, Kelly O'Donnell, and 64 others, signed a letter characterizing Brokaw as "a man of tremendous decency and integrity".

Career timeline 

 1960–1962: KTIV-TV Newscaster, weatherman, and staff announcer
 1962–1965: KMTV-TV Reporter
 1965: Anchor of WSB-TV late-evening news
 1966–2021: NBC News
 1966–1972: NBC News West Coast correspondent and KNBC anchor
 1973–1976: White House correspondent and Saturday anchor of NBC Nightly News
 1976–1981: Today Show co-anchor
 1982–1983: NBC Nightly News co-anchor
 1983–2004: NBC Nightly News anchor
 2004–2021: Special correspondent
 2004–2021: Contributing anchor
 2008: Meet the Press moderator (interim)

Bibliography 

 1998 The Greatest Generation  (hardback)  (paperback) depicting the Americans who came of age during the Great Depression and fought World War II;
 1999 The Greatest Generation Speaks: Letters and Reflections  (hardback)  (paperback);
 2001 An Album of Memories: Personal Histories from the Greatest Generation  (hardback)  (paperback);
 2002 A Long Way from Home: Growing Up in the American Heartland  (hardback)  (paperback);
 2006 Galen Rowell: A Retrospective  (hardback) Foreword by Tom Brokaw;
 2007 Boom!: Voices of the Sixties Personal Reflections on the '60s and Today  (hardback);
 2011 The Time of Our Lives: A Conversation About America  (hardback);
 2013 Christmas from Heaven: The True Story of the Berlin Candy Bomber  (hardback);
 2015 A Lucky Life Interrupted: A Memoir of Hope  (hardback)  (paperback);
 2019 The Fall of Richard Nixon: A Reporter Remembers Watergate  (hardback)  (paperback).

Awards and honors 

Public and industry awards

 1989 Peabody Award for a report called To Be an American;
 1989 Golden Plate Award of the American Academy of Achievement
 Alfred I. duPont–Columbia University Awards for excellence in broadcast journalism for Dateline NBC documentary special Why Can't We Live Together on hidden realities of racial separation in suburban America;
 Alfred I. duPont–Columbia University Award for excellence in broadcast journalism for his interview with Mikhail Gorbachev;
 Seven Emmy Awards including one for China in Crisis special report;
 1990 National Headliner Award from the National Conference of Christians and Jews for advancing the understanding of religion, race and ethnicity;
 1992 Al Neuharth Award for Excellence in the Media presented by the Freedom Forum;
 1993 Emmy award for reporting on floods in the Midwest;
 1995 Dennis Kauff Memorial Award for Lifetime Achievement in Journalism from Boston University;
 1995 Lowell Thomas Award from Marist College;
 1997 University of Missouri School of Journalism Honor Medal for Distinguished Service in Journalism;
 1998 Fred Friendly First Amendment Award, a tribute to those "individuals whose broadcast career reflects a consistent devotion to freedom of speech and the principles embodied in the First Amendment.";
 1998 American Legion award for distinguished public service in the field of communication;
 1998 Citizens' Scholarship Foundation of America's President's Award recognizing "devotion to helping young people through scholarships.";
 1999 Congressional Medal of Honor Society's "Tex" McCrary Excellence in Journalism Award;
 1999 Emmy award for international coverage of the Kosovo conflict;
 2002: Paul White Award, Radio Television Digital News Association
 2003 Peabody Award for his special report called "A Question of Fairness";
 2005 Elected to the American Academy of Arts and Sciences;
 2005 Four Freedoms Medal: Freedom of Speech And Expression;
 2006 Washington State University Edward R. Murrow School of Communications Lifetime Achievement in Broadcasting Award;
 2006 Sylvanus Thayer Award: United States Military Academy at West Point;
 2006 Walter Cronkite Award for Excellence in Journalism at Arizona State University;
 2006 Induction into the Television Hall of Fame;
 2007 Horatio Alger Award for overcoming adversity to achieve success through the American free enterprise system from the Horatio Alger Association of Distinguished Americans Inc.;
 2011 Charles Osgood Lifetime Achievement Award in Broadcast Journalism from WFUV (90.7 FM);
 2012 The Nichols-Chancellor's Medal awarded by Vanderbilt University;
 2012 Ken Burns Lifetime Achievement Award awarded at Old Sturbridge Village in Sturbridge, Massachusetts;
 2013 Peabody Award for enhancing his reputation since he left the NBC News desk in 2004.
 2014 Presidential Medal of Freedom
 2016 French Legion of Honor, for his support of World War II veterans, along with actor Tom Hanks and Gordon H. Mueller, president and co-founder of the National WWII Museum, New Orleans.

Honorary degrees

 Air University (United States Air Force);
 Arizona State University;
 Boston College;
 Brandeis University;
 California Institute of Technology;
 The College of William & Mary;
 Dartmouth College;
 Duke University;
 Emory University;
 Fairfield University;
 Fordham University;
 Florida State University
 John Carroll University;
 Johns Hopkins University;
 Montana State University;
 Mayo Clinic and the College of Medicine;
 Northwestern University;
 Providence College;
 Saint Anselm College;
 Seton Hall University;
 Skidmore College;
 St. Lawrence University;
 University of Iowa;
 University of Montana;
 University of Notre Dame;
 University of Oklahoma;
 University of Pennsylvania;
 University of South Dakota;
 University of South Carolina;
 Washington University in St. Louis.

See also
 New Yorkers in journalism

Notes

References

External links 

 
 Booknotes interview with Brokaw on The Greatest Generation, March 7, 1999.
 In Depth interview with Brokaw, May 6, 2012
 
 
 Greatest Generation online ebook read by Tom Brokaw (2 chapters)
 , transcript
 
 

American broadcast news analysts
American television reporters and correspondents
Living people
1940 births
American male journalists
NBC News people
Presidential Medal of Freedom recipients
Journalists from New York City
Journalists from South Dakota
Television anchors from Los Angeles
American people of Irish descent
University of Iowa alumni
University of South Dakota alumni
People from Webster, South Dakota
People from Pound Ridge, New York
People with multiple myeloma
20th-century American journalists
21st-century American journalists
21st-century American male writers
Recipients of the Legion of Honour